The 1944 Utah gubernatorial election was held on November 7, 1944. Incumbent Democrat Herbert B. Maw defeated Republican nominee J. Bracken Lee with 50.21% of the vote.

General election

Candidates
Herbert B. Maw, Democratic
J. Bracken Lee, Republican

Results

References

1944
Utah
Gubernatorial